Jefferson Lamar McCleskey (November 6, 1891 – May 11, 1971) was a Major League Baseball player. He played one season with the Boston Braves from September 8 to September 13, 1913.

References

External links

Boston Braves players
Major League Baseball third basemen
1891 births
1971 deaths
Baseball players from Georgia (U.S. state)
Albany Babies players
Lowell Grays players
Portland Duffs players
Elmira Colonels players
Worcester Busters players
Montgomery Rebels players
Macon Tigers players
People from Americus, Georgia